Panam Station is a station of Daejeon Metro Line 1 in Panam-dong, Dong District, Daejeon, South Korea.

Surroundings 
Panam Station is located on the 4th national road passing through the center of Daejeon Metropolitan City. In the east, panam IC is located on Tongyeong Daejeon Expressway. On the north side are Panam Neighborhood Park, Hwanghak Mountain, Dongshin Middle School, Daejeon Daeam Elementary School, Daejeon University and Yongun Market. On the south side, there are Daejeon Panam Elementary School, Dong-gu Office, and the train railway is located.

References

External links
  Panam Station from Daejeon Metropolitan Express Transit Corporation

Daejeon Metro stations
Dong District, Daejeon
Railway stations opened in 2006